The West Riding Automobile Company was a bus company that served the Wakefield area of Yorkshire, England from 1922.

Company history
The  West Riding Automobile Company was formed as a subsidiary of the Yorkshire (West Riding) Electric Tramways Company, which was founded in 1904 to operate electric tramway services in the area. However, by the 1920s, there was a decline in the use of tramways, and the West Riding Automobile Company was formed to operate bus services from its bases in Wakefield and Castleford. Twenty-two Bristol 4-ton vehicles were purchased at a cost of £30,000, and services began in April 1922. The speed of changeover was rapid, with the Castleford tramway system being abandoned just three years later.

The company purchased its rival J Bullock & Sons of Featherstone in 1950, doubling the size of its fleet. In 1952, West Riding funded the construction of Wakefield bus station close to the Bull Ring at a cost of £60,000. By the mid-1950s, the company was the largest British operator to be in private hands.

In 1967 it was acquired by the Transport Holding Company and became part of the National Bus Company on 1 January 1969.

After local government reorganisation in 1974, the company worked with the West Yorkshire Passenger Transport Executive which organised services in the area.

As part of the privatisation of the National Bus Company, West Riding was sold to Caldaire Holdings. In 1995, it was sold to British Bus, which in turn passed to the Cowie Group on 1 August 1996. West Riding was later rebranded as Arriva Yorkshire.

During its period of operation, West Riding has also had financial interests in a variety of other local operators, including Compass Bus, South Yorkshire Road Transport Company and  Yorkshire Woollen.

Vehicles
The West Riding Company used a variety of vehicles, including those produced by Guy, Bristol, AEC and Daimler, although in later years it tended to prefer those produced by Leyland. The company was involved in the development of the Guy Wulfrunian from 1959 onwards, and purchased 126 of the 137 vehicles produced and acquired a further 6 second hand.

References

External links
Flickr gallery

Companies based in Wakefield
Defunct companies based in Yorkshire
1922 establishments in England
Former bus operators in West Yorkshire